Regina Schmidt (born 24 February 1958) is a West German sprint canoer who competed in the mid-1980s. At the 1984 Summer Olympics in Los Angeles, she finished fifth in the K-4 500 m event.

References
Sports-Reference.com profile

1958 births
Canoeists at the 1984 Summer Olympics
West German female canoeists
Living people
Olympic canoeists of West Germany
Place of birth missing (living people)